2021 Polish protests may refer to:

Media Without Choice
2020–21 women's strike protests in Poland

See also 
Polish rule-of-law crisis